Charlottetown Boulder Park is an outdoor boulder park located in Charlottetown, Prince Edward Island. The park is located on the northern side of the Honourable George Coles Building, adjacent to Province House.

History 

The park was the idea of Dr. Eric Harvie, chairman of the Fathers of Confederation Memorial Citizens Foundation, and includes boulders from each of the Canadian provinces; each boulder includes a plaque that identifies the provinces from which the boulder came, along with the geological name of the rock formation. Harvie intended the park to commemorate the contribution of people from across Canada to the creation of the Confederation Centre of the Arts.

Opening 

The park opened in a ceremony on September 1, 1966, the 102nd anniversary of the start of the Charlottetown Conference. The landscaping for the park was funded by the Bank of Nova Scotia; Graham Scott, manager of the Charlottetown branch, and Dr. Frank MacKinnon, Chair of the Fathers of Confederation Memorial Trust, cut the ribbon.

Boulders

Map of boulder locations 

Boulders are sited over  site between Church Street and Province House, just south of Grafton Street.

References

Rock gardens
Charlottetown
Parks in Prince Edward Island